Yale CELI List of Companies is a comprehensive constantly updated list of 1000 plus companies worldwide and their grades from A through F based on their level of disengagement or engagement ("digging in") on indirectly or directly funding Russia's War on Ukraine. The list is managed by the Yale Chief Executive Leadership Institute (CELI) whose leaders include CELI Research Director Steven Tian and the Senior Associate Dean at the Yale School of Management, Professor and CELI President Jeffrey Sonnenfeld.

References

External links
Almost 1,000 Companies Have Curtailed Operations in Russia—But Some Remain

Lists of companies
Reactions to the 2022 Russian invasion of Ukraine
2020s-related lists